The Thompson Farm, in Pleasant Township near Georgetown, Ohio, was listed on the National Register of Historic Places in 1976.  The listing included three contributing buildings.  It has also been known as Armleder Farm.

It includes a farmhouse with Federal-style architecture, plus an original log house and smoke house.

References

National Register of Historic Places in Brown County, Ohio
Federal architecture in Ohio
Buildings and structures completed in 1840